The Congress of Tamaulipas is the legislature of Tamaulipas, a state of Mexico. The Congress is unicameral. It has 36 members, who serve three-year terms.

See also
List of Mexican state congresses

External links
Official website

Government of Tamaulipas
Tamaulipas
Tamaulipas